The 1827 New Hampshire gubernatorial election was held on March 13, 1827.

Incumbent Adams Governor David L. Morril did not stand for re-election, although he won a number of scattering votes.

Jackson nominee Benjamin Pierce was elected without serious opposition.

Democratic-Republican nomination
The Democratic-Republican members of the New Hampshire Legislature met in caucus in summer 1826 at Concord and chose Benjamin Pierce over Matthew Harvey, E. Bartlett, and incumbent Governor Morril.

General election

Candidates
David L. Morril, "Adams", incumbent Governor
Benjamin Pierce, "Jackson", sheriff of Hillsborough County

Party labels were in flux following the splitting of the Democratic-Republican Party into groups following the 1824 presidential election. Contemporary newspapers refer to Morril as a "friend of John Quincy Adams" or "supporter of the Administration" and Pierce as a "friend of Andrew Jackson".

Morril declined a re-election.

Results

Notes

References

1827
New Hampshire
Gubernatorial